The flag of Georgia, also known as the five-cross flag, is one of the national symbols of Georgia. Originally a banner of the medieval Kingdom of Georgia, it was repopularised in the late 20th and early 21st centuries during the Georgian national revival.

History 
The current flag was used by the Georgian patriotic movement following the country's independence from the Soviet Union in 1991. By the late 1990s, the design had become widely known as the Georgian historical national flag, as vexillologists had pointed out the red-on-white Jerusalem cross shown as the flag of Tbilisi in a 14th-century map by Domenico and Francesco Pizzigano. By late 2021, a newly-discovered coin of the King David the Builder with five-cross composition engraving now dates the Georgian flag to the 12th century. According to the State Council of Heraldry, the coin is of greatest importance and is an unmistakable proof for the history of the Georgian national flag being used during the reign of King David IV.

A majority of Georgians, including the influential Catholicos-Patriarch of the Georgian Orthodox Church, supported the restoration of the flag and in 1999 the Parliament of Georgia passed a bill to change the flag. However, it was not endorsed by the then-President Eduard Shevardnadze. It was adopted in the early 2000s by the main opposition party, the United National Movement led by Mikheil Saakashvili, as a symbol of popular resistance to Shevardnadze's rule as well as a symbol of the Rose Revolution.

The flag was adopted by Parliament on 14 January 2004. Saakashvili formally endorsed it via Presidential Decree No. 31 signed on 25 January, following his election as president. 14 January is annually marked as a Flag Day in Georgia.

Design 
The national flag of Georgia, as described in the decree:

The Georgian national flag is a white rectangle, with a large red cross in its central portion
 touching all four sides of the flag. In the four corners there are four bolnur-katskhuri crosses (also referred to as a Georgian Cross or a Grapevine cross) of the same color as the large cross.

Previous flags

Early Georgian states 

The first Georgian flag design came about during the era of the early Georgian state, the Principality of Iberia which had a red cross against a white background, similar to the flag of England.
The subsequent Principality of Tao-Klarjeti shared this same flag. The flag of the Kingdom of Abkhazia had 4 green strips in a dextral position, while the left side contained the cross seen on the current Georgian flag.

Medieval Georgian flags 

The white flag with the single red St. George's cross was supposedly used by King Vakhtang I in the 5th century. According to tradition, King Tamar (d. 1213) used a flag with a dark red cross and a star in a white field. In the 1367 map by Domenico and Francesco Pizzigano, the flag of Tifilis (Tbilisi) is shown as a Jerusalem cross (a large cross with smaller crosses in each quarter). According to D. Kldiashvili (1997), the  Jerusalem cross might have been adopted during the reign of King George V.

Collapse of Kingdom of Georgia 

After the collapse of the Kingdom of Georgia, its successor states adopted their own flags, with most of them using animals as their representative symbols.

Kingdom of Kartli-Kakheti (1762–1801) 

The kingdom was formed through the unification of Kartli and Kakheti. The flag had a white cross against a black background. The country lost its independence in 1801 to annexation by the Russian Empire.

Democratic Republic of Georgia (1918–1921) 

During Georgia's brief existence as an independent state as the Democratic Republic of Georgia from 1918–1921 , a flag consisting of a dark red field with black and white bands in the canton was adopted; coincidentally, the black and white bands resemble both the civilian flag of Prussia (used until 1933) and the flag of the Swiss canton of Fribourg, especially the latter. The design resulted from a national flag-designing contest won by the painter Iakob Nikoladze. It was abolished by the Soviet Union following the 1921 incorporation of Georgia into the USSR. After the collapse of the USSR, Georgia adopted a modified version with the black and white bars extended (see below).

Georgian Soviet Socialist Republic (1921–1991) 

During the Soviet period, Georgia adopted several variants of the red Soviet flag incorporating first the Georgian Soviet Socialist Republic's name, and later a red hammer and sickle with a star in a blue sun in the canton and a blue bar in the upper part of flag. The flag of the Georgian SSR was replaced by the flag of the Democratic Republic of Georgia by the Georgian government in November 1990, shortly before it declared independence from the Soviet Union.

Georgia (1991–2004) 

The previous flag used by the Democratic Republic of Georgia from 1918 to 1921 was reestablished as the flag of the Republic of Georgia on 8 December 1991, by the Supreme Council of the Republic of Georgia. However, it lost popularity thereafter as it became associated with the chaotic and violent period after the collapse of the Soviet Union. The wine-red color symbolises the good times of the past as well as the future, whilst the black represents Russian rule, and the white represents hope for peace. This flag was later replaced by the current Georgian flag following the bloodless Rose Revolution.

See also 

 Flag of the Georgian Soviet Socialist Republic
 Coat of arms of Georgia (country)
 Flag of Abkhazia
 Flag of Adjara
 Flag of South Ossetia
 Flag of England

References

External links 
 
 

 
 
 
 
 
 

 
Georgia
Georgia (country)
National symbols of Georgia (country)
Georgia
Georgia
Georgia
Georgia